The men's shot put event at the 1967 Pan American Games was held in Winnipeg on 29 July.

Results

References

Athletics at the 1967 Pan American Games
1967